Rune Paeshuyse (born 22 March 2002) is a Belgian professional footballer who plays as a centre-back for the Belgian Pro League club Eupen.

Club career
Paeshuyse is a youth product of Turnhout and Mechelen, having played with the club for 10 years. He signed his first professional contract with the club on 23 January 2020 until 2022. He made his senior and professional debut with Mechelen as a late substitute in a 3–2 Belgian Pro League  loss to Charleroi on 14 May 2022. On 24 May 2022, he moved to Eupen on a free transfer signing a 3-year contract.

International career
Paeshuyse is a youth international for Belgium, having played for the Belgium U19s in 2020.

References

External links

RBFA Profile

2002 births
Living people
People from Edegem
Belgian footballers
Belgium youth international footballers
Association football defenders
K.V. Mechelen players
K.A.S. Eupen players
Belgian Pro League players